Frederick William Kahapula Beckley may refer to:
 Frederick William Kahapula Beckley Sr. (1845–1881), Governor of Kauaʻi from 1880 to 1881
 Frederick William Kahapula Beckley Jr. (1874–1943), Hawaiian politician, historian and educator